Renato Cattaneo may refer to:

 Renato Cattaneo (footballer, born 1903), Italian football player and coach who played for the Italian national team, Alessandria and Roma in the 1930s and later managed Alessandria and Parma
 Renato Cattaneo (footballer, born 1923), Italian footballer who played for Lucchese, Como and Catania in the 1950s